Shombi Sharp (born 1969) is an American diplomat with the United Nations, UN Resident Coordinator in India․

Career 
On November 15, 2021, Sharp was appointed by the UN Secretary-General as UN Resident Coordinator in India. As UNRC, Sharp is the direct representative of the UN Secretary-General and highest ranking UN official based in the country, carrying a diplomatic rank equivalent to Ambassador of a foreign state. He also serves as Designated Official for Security of the UN system in country.

Prior to taking up his appointment in India, Sharp served in a number of capacities in various parts of the world, including Southern Africa, New York, Eastern Europe, Central Asia, the Middle East and the South Caucasus. He is both a published author of works in the health economics field and a seasoned manager of technical assistance portfolios at the country and regional levels for over 20 years, with graduate training in economics and public health management. Sharp has served in a number of advisory positions, including as member of the World Health Organization’s Knowledge Hub Advisory Board in Zagreb, Croatia, and as a World Bank Expert Panel member for Europe and Central Asia in Washington, DC. He was designated a USAID “Policy Champion” and nominated for the UNDP Administrator's Award, while having also spoken at numerous international fora, including the European Health Forum, Central European University, the Council on Foreign Relations, the Goldman Sachs Global Leaders Programmeme, and the Social Science Research Council in NY, USA.

Following several years in advertising, Sharp began his international development career in 1997 as Project Manager and Crisis Response Coordinator for CARE International in Harare, Zimbabwe. From 2001 to 2002 he served as the Moscow-based Assistant Resident Representative of the United Nations Development Programme (UNDP) in Russia, and from 2002 to 2005, as a Programme Manager in the Western Balkans cluster of the UNDP Regional Bureau for Europe and CIS (RBEC) in New York, USA. From 2006 to 2010, Sharp led the Regional HIV/AIDS Practice for RBEC, covering over 20 countries and from 2010-2014 he was posted in Beirut as Deputy Country Director for UNDP Lebanon. There Sharp also served as Lead Coordinator for the Social Cohesion and Livelihoods sector of the international community's Regional Response Plan to the Syrian refugee crisis, coordinating a sectoral work plan of nearly US$100 million annually across 27 implementing organisations. From 2014 to 2018 Sharp served as the UNDP Deputy Resident Representative in Georgia Immediately prior to his current posting as UN Resident Coordinator in India, Sharp was the UNDP Resident Representative in 2018 and UN Resident Coordinator in Armenia from 2018 to 2021.

Education
Sharp graduated from the University of Colorado at Boulder with a master's degree in Economics and the University of Kansas with a Bachelor of Business Administration degree. He has also completed the Executive Programme at the University of Chicago, Booth School of Business, and received a Postgraduate Diploma in HIV/AIDS Management from the National Medical University of South Africa and Stellenbosch University in South Africa.

Personal life
A US citizen, Sharp was born in Los Angeles, California and raised in Kansas City, where he attended the Pembroke Hill School. He and his wife, the artist Sarah Watterson, have two children.

References

External links 
 REVERSING, THE EPIDEMIC, FACTS AND POLICY OPTIONS 

1969 births
Living people
People from Los Angeles
American officials of the United Nations
Economists from California
University of Kansas alumni
21st-century American economists